Kelly  may refer to:

Art and entertainment 
 Kelly (Kelly Price album)
 Kelly (Andrea Faustini album)
 Kelly (musical), a 1965 musical by Mark Charlap
 "Kelly" (song), a 2018 single by Kelly Rowland
 Kelly (film), a 1981 Canadian film
 Kelly (Australian TV series), an Australian television
 Kelly (talk show), a Northern Ireland television talk and variety show
 The Kelly Family, an Irish-American-European music group
 Kelly Kelly (TV series), a 1998 U.S. sitcom on the WB television network
 "Kelly", a 2019 single by Peakboy
 Kelly West/Zelena, a character on Once Upon a Time
 Kelly (The Walking Dead), a fictional character from The Walking Dead

People 
 Kelly (given name)
 Kelly (surname)
 Clan Kelly, a Scottish clan
 Kelly (musician), a character portrayed by Liam Kyle Sullivan
 Kelly (murder victim), once known as the "El Dorado Jane Doe"
 Kelly (footballer, born 1975), Clesly Evandro Guimarães, Brazilian football manager and former attacking midfielder
 Kelly (footballer, born 1985), Kelly Cristina Pereira da Silva, Brazilian football forward
 Kelly (footballer, born 1987), Kelly Rodrigues Santana Costa, Brazilian football defender

Places

Australia
 Kelly, South Australia, a locality
 Kelly Basin, Tasmania
 Hundred of Kelly, a cadastral unit in South Australia

Azerbaijan
 Kollu, Dashkasan

Trinidad and Tobago
 Kelly Village, Caroni County, Tunapuna-Piarco

United Kingdom
 Kelly, Devon
 Kelly Bray, Cornwall
 Celliwig, Welsh spelling of the earliest location of King Arthur's court

United States
 Kelly, Kansas
 Kelly, Kentucky
 Kelly, Louisiana
 Kelly, North Carolina
 Kelly, Texas
 Kelly, West Virginia
 Kelly, Wisconsin, a town
 Kelly, Juneau County, Wisconsin, an unincorporated community
 Kelly, Wyoming
 Kelly Field, formerly Kelly Air Force Base, San Antonio, Texas
 Kelly Ridge, California, a CDP
 Kelly Township, Union County, Pennsylvania

See also 
 
 Earl of Kellie, title of Scottish peers
 Keeley (disambiguation)
 Keely, a surname
 Kelley (disambiguation)
 Kelli (disambiguation)
 Kellie (disambiguation)
 Kellyville (disambiguation)